Santiago Emiliano González Areco (born June 11, 1992) is an Uruguayan professional footballer.

Career

Club
Santiago González began his career in the youth system of Montevideo club Sud América. In 2011, he made his first team debut and during the 2012–13 Uruguayan Segunda División season helped Sud América gain promotion to the top flight as Segunda División champions. In his first season in the Uruguayan Primera División González was the team's top scorer with five goals and two assists in 14 matches.

On February 14, 2014 the Montreal Impact announced the signing of González for an undisclosed fee.   The transfer fell under Major League Soccer's Special Discovery rule. He is a dynamic forward that moves very well and can play with his back to the goal, as described by Montreal sporting director Nick De Santis. He made his first appearance in the pre-season on February 16, 2014 against Orlando City Soccer Club and scored in the 56th minute. González was released by Montreal on 1 April 2015.

In September 2020, González joined Uruguay Montevideo.

International
González has represented Uruguay at the Under 17 level. He appeared for his nation in two matches during the 2009 FIFA U-17 World Cup.

Honors

Montreal Impact
Canadian Championship (1): 2014

References

External links

1992 births
Living people
Uruguayan footballers
Uruguayan expatriate footballers
Sud América players
CF Montréal players
Danubio F.C. players
Villa Teresa players
Huracán F.C. players
Rampla Juniors players
Uruguay Montevideo players
Association football midfielders
Uruguayan Primera División players
Uruguayan Segunda División players
Major League Soccer players
Uruguay youth international footballers
Uruguayan expatriate sportspeople in Canada
Expatriate soccer players in Canada